Crataegus coccinea, the scarlet hawthorn, is a species of hawthorn around which there is considerable confusion because the name has been misapplied for a long time. It has been shown to be the same as C. pedicellata, and under the rules of botanical nomenclature, the older name (C. coccinea) should be used.

Taxonomic history
In 1901, Charles Sprague Sargent chose a lectotype for Crataegus coccinea from among Linnaeus's specimens, but chose a specimen that resembles C. dodgei Ashe. Sargent's lectotype opinion was followed by other authors until he realized his error and corrected it in 1909. The name C. coccinea has also been misapplied to specimens of C. intricata Lange. For almost 100 years, particularly since 1910, this species was generally called Crataegus pedicellata Sarg. except by a few authors.

Linnaeus's original description was inadequate to make a decision between various unrelated species, including C. nigra, C. phaenopyrum, and C. mollis. A component of the 2003 lectotype decision was that John Claudius Loudon had founded series Coccineae on C. coccinea, which includes C. pedicellata, to which Linnaeus's specimen 187 of the Clifford Herbarium (now at the British Museum) is considered to belong. With this taxonomy, C. pedicellata Sarg. is a heterotypic synonym of C. coccinea L.

References

External links
 Crataegus pedicellata picture at www.sci.muni.cz

coccinea
Trees of the Southeastern United States
Flora of North America
Plants described in 1753
Taxa named by Carl Linnaeus